The Korea Liberation Corps was a Korean association formed 1913 to fight against Japanese rule. At its height its members numbered about 200. The Korea Liberation Association (대한광복회, 大韓光復會) was a successor organization to Korea Liberation Corps.

The corps was initially organized in Punggi by Kim Byeong-yeol, Kang Byeong-su, Yu Chang-sun, Jang Du-hwan, Yi Gak, Han Hun, Yu Jang-yeol, Jeong Jin-hwa, Chae Gi-jung, Jeong Man-gyo, Hwang Sang-gyu, Kim Sang-ok, and Jeong Un-hong. This group is sometimes called the "Punggi Gwangbokdan," or Punggi Liberation Corps.  In 1915 this group united with a group of independence leaders in Daegu at an assembly in Dalseong Park, to officially form the Korea Liberation Corps.

A memorial park for the corps was created in Punggi-eup in 1994 and completed in 2003.

See also
History of Korea
Korean independence movement

References
"대한 광복단의 항일 투쟁," pp. 595–598 in

External links
Invil profile of the memorial park
Profile of Yu Chang-sun
Korean independence movement
North Gyeongsang Province